Andrew Leonard Emerson was an American politician from Maine. Emerson served two single year terms in the Maine House of Representatives (1828; 1829) and was the first Mayor of Portland, Maine in 1832. The city had previously been organized as a town. The Emerson School, built in 1897–1898 in the Munjoy Hill neighborhood of Portland, is named in Andrew Emerson's honor. It was used until the 1970s, when it was converted into affordable housing.

References

Year of birth missing
Year of death missing
Members of the Maine House of Representatives
Mayors of Portland, Maine
Phillips Exeter Academy alumni